Andreas Feldenkirchen is a German curler.

Teams

References

External links

 retail beratung | retailmind | andreas feldenkirchen
 
 Andreas Feldenkirchen - FürSprecher - Lust auf Gut
 Ich denke mal, sie werden auch versuchen rein zu spielen ... (p.p. 3, 4)
 Andreas_Feldenkirchen - XING profile

Living people
German male curlers
Year of birth missing (living people)
Place of birth missing (living people)
20th-century German people